Reticulocytosis is a condition where there is an increase in reticulocytes, immature red blood cells. 
It is commonly seen in anemia. They are seen on blood films when the bone marrow is highly active in an attempt to replace red blood cell loss such as in haemolytic anaemia or haemorrhage.

External links 

Histology
Abnormal clinical and laboratory findings for RBCs